Thomas Randolph, 2nd Earl of Moray (died 11 August 1332), a Scottish military commander, held his title for just 23 days.

The son of Thomas Randolph, 1st Earl of Moray, a companion-in-arms of King Robert the Bruce, he succeeded his father on 20 July 1332.

Thomas, 2nd Earl of Moray had a chief command under the Earl of Mar ranged against the army of Edward Balliol at the Battle of Dupplin Moor, where he was killed. He died childless.

References
 Traquair, Peter, Freedom's Sword 1997
 Anderson, William, The Scottish Nation, Edinburgh, 1867, vol.vii, pp. 200–1.

1332 deaths
Year of birth unknown
Earls of Moray
Scottish deaths at the Battle of Dupplin Moor
Lords of Annandale
14th-century Scottish earls
Lords of Badenoch